Hoplodoris hansrosaorum is a species of sea slug, a dorid nudibranch, a marine gastropod mollusc in the family Discodorididae''.

Distribution
This species was described from the intertidal zone, Ilha de Cabo Frio, Arraial do Cabo, Brazil. It has subsequently been reported from Florida and Bonaire.

References

Discodorididae
Gastropods described in 2006